Somasundaram Senathirajah born 27 October 1942; commonly known as Mavai Senathirajah) is a Sri Lankan Tamil politician and Member of Parliament. He is the current leader of the Illankai Tamil Arasu Kachchi (ITAK), a member of the Tamil National Alliance (TNA).

Early life
Senathirajah was born on 27 October 1942. He was educated Veemanramam School and Nadeswara College. After school he joined the University of Ceylon, Peradeniya as an external student and graduated with a bachelor's degree.

Senathirajah got involved in the Sri Lankan Tamil nationalism movement at a young age and took part in the 1961 satyagraha. He joined the youth wing of Illankai Tamil Arasu Kachchi (ITAK), the Tamil Youth League, in 1962. He was secretary of the Eela Thamil Elanger Eyakam (Eelam Tamil Youth Movement) from 1966 to 1969. He was arrested on several occasions between 1969 and 1983 and spent seven years imprisoned at eight different prisons. He became secretary of the Tamil Youth Front, the youth wing the Tamil United Liberation Front (TULF), in 1972.

Career
Senathirajah was one of the ENDLF/EPRLF/TELO/TULF alliance's candidates in Jaffna District at the 1989 parliamentary election but failed to get elected after coming 13th amongst the alliance candidates. However, he entered Parliament in 1989 when he was appointed as a National List Member of Parliament for the TULF, replacing A. Amirthalingam who had been assassinated on 13 July 1989. He re-entered Parliament in 1999 as a National List Member of Parliament for the TULF following the assassination of Neelan Tiruchelvam on 29 July 1999.

Senathirajah was one of the TULF's candidates in Jaffna District at the 2000 parliamentary election. He was elected and re-entered Parliament. On 20 October 2001 the All Ceylon Tamil Congress, Eelam People's Revolutionary Liberation Front, Tamil Eelam Liberation Organization and TULF formed the Tamil National Alliance (TNA). Senathirajah contested the 2001 parliamentary election as one of the TNA's candidates in Jaffna District. He was elected and re-entered Parliament. He was re-elected at the 2004, 2010 and 2015 parliamentary elections.

Senathirajah was general-secretary of ITAK before being elected leader of ITAK 6 September 2014. Senathirajah is one of a trio of MPs (the other two being R. Sampanthan and M. A. Sumanthiran) who lead the TNA.

Electoral history

References

External links

1942 births
Alumni of the University of Ceylon (Peradeniya)
Living people
Illankai Tamil Arasu Kachchi politicians
Members of the 9th Parliament of Sri Lanka
Members of the 10th Parliament of Sri Lanka
Members of the 11th Parliament of Sri Lanka
Members of the 12th Parliament of Sri Lanka
Members of the 13th Parliament of Sri Lanka
Members of the 14th Parliament of Sri Lanka
Members of the 15th Parliament of Sri Lanka
People from Northern Province, Sri Lanka
Sri Lankan Hindus
Sri Lankan Tamil politicians
Tamil National Alliance politicians
Tamil United Liberation Front politicians